Meagan Hanson is an attorney and former Georgia State Representative from Brookhaven, Georgia. A member of the Republican Party, she defeated Democratic Party incumbent Taylor Bennett in November 2016 in an upset. Hanson represented House District 80, which includes most of Brookhaven along with portions of the adjacent cities of Sandy Springs and Chamblee.

On November 6, 2018, Hanson lost her bid for re-election to Matthew Wilson.

Hanson was a candidate in the Republican primary for Georgia's 6th congressional district in the 2022 election, losing the nomination to Rich McCormick.

References

External links 
 Campaign website
 Meagan Hanson at ballotpedia.org

21st-century American politicians
21st-century American women politicians
Candidates in the 2022 United States House of Representatives elections
Living people
Republican Party members of the Georgia House of Representatives
People from Brookhaven, Georgia
University of Alabama alumni
Year of birth missing (living people)